This is a list of the schools in Division II of the National Collegiate Athletic Association (NCAA) in the United States and Canada that have wrestling as a varsity sport. In the 2022–23 season, there are a total of 67 Division II wrestling programs.

NCAA Division II wrestling programs

Reclassifying institutions in yellow. Institution confirmed to be leaving Division II in pink.

 All schools listed as competing in Conference Carolinas men's wrestling technically compete in South Atlantic Conference Carolinas, a formal alliance between CC and the South Atlantic Conference that operates in field hockey and men's wrestling. CC administers the SACC wrestling championship, while the SAC administers the field hockey championship.

Future Division II wrestling programs

See also

NCAA Division II Wrestling Championships
List of NCAA Division II institutions
List of NCAA Division II football programs
List of NCAA Division II lacrosse programs
List of NCAA Division II men's soccer programs
List of NCAA Divisions II and III schools competing in NCAA Division I sports
Collegiate wrestling
List of NCAA Division I wrestling programs

References

External links

NCAA Division II Wrestling Sponsorship
NCAA Division II Wrestling Home

Wrestling
NCAA
Wrestling